Obradović is a Serbian patronymic surname derived from a masculine given name Obrad. It may refer to:

 Aleksandar Obradović, Serbian composer
 Bogdan Obradović, Serbian tennis coach
 Dositej Obradović, Serbian author
 Đorđe Obradović-Ćurčija (d. 1804), Serbian rebel
 Goran Obradović (b. 1976), Serbian footballer
 Goran Obradović (b. 1986), Serbian footballer
 Iva Obradović, Serbian rower
 Ivan Obradović, Serbian footballer
 Marija Obradović, Serbian handball player
 Milan Obradović, Serbian footballer
 Miloš Obradović, Serbian footballer
 Milovan Obradović, Serbian footballer
 Radojko Obradović, Serbian politician
 Saša Obradović, Serbian basketball coach and former player
 Srđan Obradović, Serbian footballer
 Svetozar Obradović, Serbian writer
 Vuk Obradović, Serbian general
 Žarko Obradović, Serbian politician
 Željko Obradović, Serbian basketball coach

In popular culture
 Mess O'Bradovich, a character in a video game Cadillacs and Dinosaurs (video game)

Serbian surnames
Slavic-language surnames
Patronymic surnames
Surnames from given names